Enrico Bearzotti (born 29 October 1996) is an Italian football player who plays for  club Siena.

Club career
He made his Serie C debut for Padova on 6 September 2015 in a game against Reggiana.

On 5 January 2019, he joined Monza on loan.

For the 2019–20 season, he joined Modena.

On 30 July 2021, he signed a two-year contract with Catanzaro. On 4 January 2022, he joined Trento on loan.

On 3 February 2023, Bearzotti signed with Siena.

References

External links
 

1996 births
People from Palmanova
Footballers from Friuli Venezia Giulia
Living people
Italian footballers
Association football forwards
Pordenone Calcio players
Hellas Verona F.C. players
Calcio Padova players
S.S. Arezzo players
Cosenza Calcio players
A.C. Monza players
Modena F.C. players
U.S. Catanzaro 1929 players
A.C. Trento 1921 players
A.C.N. Siena 1904 players
Serie A players
Serie C players
Serie D players